The following is a list of Sri Lankan writers of all types.

Poets

Novelists
 Tissa Abeysekera
 Nihal De Silva
 Chitra Fernando
 Vijita Fernando
 Romesh Gunesekera
 Shehan Karunatilaka
 Carl Muller
 Michael Ondaatje
 Denagama Siriwardena
 W. A. Silva
 Vivimarie Vanderpoorten
 Sybil Wettasinghe
 Martin Wickramasinghe
 Punyakante Wijenaike
 Rajiva Wijesinha
 G. B. Senanayake
 Sugathapala de Silva
 Mahagama Sekara
 Simon Navagattegama
 Dominic Jeeva
 Ediriweera Sarachchandra
 K. Jayatillake

References
 

 
Writers
Sri Lanka